is a Japanese film director and screenwriter. While working as an editor at Magazine House, he wrote screenplays, and made his debut as a screenwriter with his original scenario DOOR (dir. Banmei Takahashi). Later, he quit Magazine House and became a film director.

Filmography
 Tomie (1999)
 Lovers' Kiss (2003)
 Einstein Girl (2005)
 Tomie: Beginning (2005)
 Tomie: Revenge (2005)
 Apartment 1303 (2007)
 Kisshō Tennyo (2007)
 Higurashi no Naku Koro ni (2008)
 Higurashi no Naku Koro ni Chikai (2009)
 Shojō Sensō (2011)

References

External links
 

1957 births
Japanese film directors
Living people
Japanese people of Romanian descent